Kelly Carl Petillo (born Cavino Michele Petillo; December 5, 1903 or December 16, 1903 – June 30, 1970) was an American racecar driver born in Pittsburgh.

Life and career
Born in Pittsburgh, Pennsylvania in 1903, Petillo moved with his family to Huntington Park, California in 1921. He began racing at Los Angeles' Legion Ascot Speedway in 1929.

Petillo competed in the Indianapolis 500 on ten occasions, winning the race in 1935 in a year that marked the first win by a car powered by an Offenhauser engine.  He went on to win the 1935 AAA-sanctioned National Driving Championship.  In 1937, he participated in the Vanderbilt Cup but engine problems forced him out of the race.

In 1942, Petillo sustained a concussion and lacerations after a road accident when his car collided with a freight train.  He was denied entry to the 1946 Indianapolis 500, and sued the Indianapolis Motor Speedway for $50,000.

Off the track, Petillo had numerous run-ins with the law, including charges of attempted rape and attempted murder.  In 1948, police arrested him in victory lane after winning a race at Owosso Speedway, on charges of assault to commit murder seven days earlier.  This was assault and battery.  He was sentenced to ten years in the Indiana State Prison.  He was released on parole in 1955, but went missing.  He was re-captured in 1957, incidentally, at the Indianapolis Motor Speedway.  He was returned to prison until 1959, after which he was denied entry to the Indianapolis 500 in 1959 and 1960, officially due to age.  After his exclusion in 1959, he again filed a lawsuit for $50,000 against the speedway and the United States Auto Club.

Petillo had a small role in the 1939 motion picture Burn 'Em Up O'Connor.

Petillo and his wife, Valentine, who filed for divorce in 1943, had a son, Kelly Jr.

Petillo died of emphysema in Los Angeles in 1970, aged 66.  He is buried in Pacific Crest Cemetery in Redondo Beach, California.

Awards
Petillo was inducted into the National Sprint Car Hall of Fame in 2009.

Indianapolis 500 results

References

1903 births
American people of Italian descent
1970 deaths
Sportspeople from Pittsburgh
Racing drivers from Pennsylvania
Racing drivers from Pittsburgh
Racing drivers from California
Champ Car champions
Indianapolis 500 drivers
Indianapolis 500 polesitters
Indianapolis 500 winners
AAA Championship Car drivers
People convicted of battery
Deaths from emphysema